Odzun is a village in the Lori Province of Armenia. It is situated on a plateau above the left bank of the Debed river gorge, about a thousand metres above the Yerevan–Tbilisi highway, a few kilometres south of the town of Alaverdi. It is famous for the 5-7th century Odzun Church, one of the finest Armenian basilicas with a cupola, overlooking the gorge.

Etymology
The name Odzun comes from the Armenian word "otzel", which means to ordain and in medieval manuscripts is mentioned as Otzun.

History and folklore
In the 1st century AD Thomas the Apostle, one of the twelve disciples of Jesus, came to Odzun and ordained priests and bishops. Before leaving for India, Thomas buried Christ's swaddling clothes underneath the altar of the church of the Holy Mother of God. There is a 6th-century inscription attesting to this above the southern door of the church.

Odznetsi
Catholicos St John the Philosopher Odznetsi (catholicosal reign: 717–728) was born in Odzun, a village in the Tashirq province of the Gugarq state. At first he was educated in the parochial school of the church of the Mother of God in Odzun. Then he studied under the teacher Theodoros Qrtenavor in Aragatzotn province of Ayrarat state. He was elected Catholicos in 717. In 719 when Caliph Omar heard of Odznetsi's holiness, he invited him to Damascus. The caliph, seeing his handsome appearance and ostentatious clothing said that Christ and the Apostles dressed much more modestly, but Odznetsi, as their follower, did not. Odznetsi asked everyone present to leave and then showed the caliph the goat-wool rags under his resplendent clothing. When Omar saw wounds on Odznetsi's body, which were the result of the ascetic lifestyle of a monk, he began to venerate Odznetsi and promised to do everything he wished for. Thanks to Odznetsi Christianity was preached freely and the lands that belonged to the martyred lords of Khram and Nakhijevan were returned to their sons. Armenia was free from taxation for 3 years and the Church never paid any taxes throughout the Arab reign. Under the Arabs, the Byzantines were banned from Armenia and for the first time since 428 the country was under the rule of one country. This was the basis of the establishment of the Armenian Bagratuni dynasty.

After the meeting with Caliph Omar, Odznetsi drove the Byzantines away from Armenia with the help of the Arab army. The indignant Greek Patriarch said that he would catch Odznetsi and throw him into a boiling kettle. However, Odznetsi himself captured the Patriarch. He threw the cross into the boiling water and offered a deal: whoever could take the cross out of the water would mean that their religion is the right one. The Patriarch burnt his hand but the Odznetsi took the cross without any harm. After seeing this, the Greek Vasid turned away from the Patriarch's men and accepted the religion of the Armenian Church and decided to stay in Armenia. The large monastery complex called the Sourb Nshan (Holy Cross) of Horomayr was established in 12th and 13th centuries to commemorate Vasid's conversion.

Obelisk outside the monastery
 
Opposite the north wall of the church is an unusual monument: two roughly hewn rectangular rock obelisks encased in huge blocks of stone. A legend says that it was given by an Indian king for the help he received from an Armenian General from Odzun.

An account of it is given by Mesrovb Jacob Seth, a Calcutta-Armenian. 
 
In 149 BC Gissaneh and Demeter, two princes of Kannauj, plotted against their father, Dinakspall. The names are from Syrian and Armenian sources and thus do not resemble Indian names much. Seth says that Gissaneh could be Krishna, Demeter Juagnath, while Dinakspall could be Dinesh Pal. The conspiracy was detected and the princes fled to the Sub Caucasus kingdom of Armenia, which at that time was much larger than now. According to a map by Ptolemy the larger Armenia was on the Black Sea and the Caspian Sea. Its merchant ships used to sail to India and China.

In Armenia, King Valarsaces welcomed them. But within fifteen years, these two princes had been executed, perhaps for plotting against the king.

The three sons of Gissaneh and Demeter – Kuars, Meghtes and Horean – were allowed to rule over Taron (now in Turkey's province of Van) and established cities known by their names. They later founded the city of Kharkh high in the mountains of northwest Armenia, as it was a safer and pleasanter place. Here they built two temples in the names of their fathers.  
 
These cities prospered till 301 AD. By then Christianity, which had entered Armenia in 66 AD, had spread all over and a conflict was imminent. Basically it was an economic fight, under the garb of religion, as the Hindus who had been there for 450 years had become very rich from trade. They had “long tufts of hair on their clean-shaven pates”, which is what we call chotis. There was a fierce battle in 301 AD between the Christians and the Hindus.

The Armenians were led by a prince of Angegh, the Indians by a prince called Demeter and a soldier priest called Artzan or Arjun. Artzan means statue in Armenian. Odzun, pronounced as Awjun, could be Arjun.

The army of some 6000 Hindus was eventually defeated. During it some of the 5000 Armenian troops who were converted Hindus joined their former brethren and this prolonged the bloody conflict. Artzan was killed and so was Demeter, but not before he had killed a popular Armenian prince during the battle. Seeing so much blood shed, a truce to bury the dead was arranged. Zenob, a chronicler of that age, records that 1038 Hindus were buried. The Armenians built a strange monument with two obelisk-holding arches as a tribute to the bravery of both the adversaries.

The Odzun church was influential among Armenians. From 717 to 728 AD, it was the seat of the Armenian Catholicos Yovhan Awjnec, whose statue stands in the town. He, however, shifted it to Echmiadzin near Yerevan – the headquarters to this day.

The church is cavernous, spartan, and gloomy, especially in winter. There are graves of important and useful persons from history outside the church. Its grounds are strewn with ancient khatchkars or crosses hewn on stone slabs that also depict fragments of contemporary history. There is also a slab commemorating people from Odzun who fell fighting in WW II, with an etched outline of Stalin’s face decorating a small corner of it.

The Odzun Church is large, built in the sixth century on a plateau dominated by a ridge that looks close enough to walk to but is actually across a narrow valley. It has been repaired and reconstructed after the depredations of the Arabs and the Persians from the Middle Ages till the seventeenth century. It is in pink felsite stone, with which most of the buildings in Armenia appear to be made.

Like most churches of this period, the Odzun church does not have windows at waist level. Its four windows are narrow slats high up near the dome and let in light only just before sunset or after sunrise. On either side of a sunrise-facing window stand sculpted angels holding snakes. The two snakes entwine to decorate a bust of Christ. This is very unusual in Christian art. In Christian art the snake represents evil, and is never found in the same space as Christ.

Perhaps the motif carries traces of the 450-year presence of Hindus. Snakes, after all, are sacred in Hinduism. Veeshap is the Armenian word for snake, and a town called Veeshap was established by the descendants of Demeter and Ginasseh. Veeshap could very well have its roots in the Sanskrit vish, or poison and the Hindi word for snake called saanp.

Tourism
There are 4 B&Bs and 2 hotels in Odzun.

References

External links

Populated places in Lori Province